The Association's Sports of Forces Armed Royal (Women) (Arabic: الجمعية الرياضية للقوات المسلحة الملكية‎; AS FAR), (Arabic: نادي الجيش الملكي‎), is a Moroccan professional women's football club based in Morocco's capital (Rabat-Salé), that competes in Moroccan Women's Championship, the top tier of Moroccan football.

The club has won the Moroccan Women's Championship on a record 9 times. The club is affiliated to men's team of AS FAR who have been playing in the Botola since its inception in 1958–1959.

In domestic football, the club has won 17 trophies; 9 Moroccan Women's Championship titles, 8 Moroccan Women Throne Cup. In international competitions, Asfar have won 1 trophy; 1 CAF Women's Champions League title.

History
The team won the national league in 2021. Afterwards they won the UNAF zonal qualifier which qualified them to the inaugural 2021 CAF Women's Champions League. 

In the 2021 CAF Women's Champions League, ASFAR qualified to the knockout stages after finishing second in the group stages winning against Rivers Angels, drawing against Mamelodi Sundowns and losing against Vihiga Queens. They lost 2-1 to Hasaacas Ladies in the semi-final. On November 18, Asfar clinched the third place by beating Malabo Kings 3–1. 

In 11 May 2022, ASFAR won their tenth National Championship title. In the next edition of the Women's Champions League, ASFAR qualified to the knockout stages after finishing top in the group stages winning all three matches. They defeated Bayelsa Queens in the semi-final, to make their first appearance in the Champions League final. On 13 November 2022, Asfar won their first African cup after defeating Mamelodi Sundowns 4-0 in the 2022 CAF Women's Champions League Final. After winning their continental trophy, King Mohammed VI congratulated them for their heroic performance in becoming the first Moroccan and first North African team to win the Women's champions league. After their asthonishing performance, ASFAR has been named the second-best women’s club in Africa for the year 2022 by IFFHS, after receiving a total of 152 points, while first-place holders South Africa’s Mamelodi Sundowns Ladies claimed 174 points.

Grounds

Prince Moulay Abdellah Stadium

Prince Moulay Abdellah Stadium is a multi-purpose stadium in Rabat, Morocco. It is named after Prince Moulay Abdellah of Morocco. It was built in 1983 and is the home ground of ASFAR. It is currently used mostly for football matches and it can also stage athletics. The stadium holds 52,000. Since 2008 it is host of the Meeting International Mohammed VI d'Athlétisme de Rabat. It was a confirmed venue for the 2015 Africa Cup of Nations until Morocco was stripped of its hosting rights. It was also a venue for the 2014 FIFA Club World Cup.

Sports Center of FAR

Honours

Domestic 
League titles

 Moroccan Women's Championship

 Winners (record) (9): 2013, 2014, 2016, 2017, 2018, 2019, 2020, 2021, 2022
 Runner-up (1): 2015

 Moroccan Women Throne Cup

 Winners (record)  (8): 2013, 2014, 2015, 2016, 2017, 2018, 2019, 2020

Continental 

CAF Women's Champions League
 Winners (record) (1): 2022
 Third place: 2021

 UNAF-CAF Women's Champions League Qualifiers
 Winners  (1): 2021

 Morocco-United Arab Emirates Friendship Cup
 Winners  (1): 2016

Performance in CAF competitions
CAF Women's Champions League: 2 appearances
2021 – Third place
2022 – Champion

See also 

 AS FAR (football club)

 Moroccan Women's Championship

References

External links 

 AS FAR (women) on Instagram
Women's football clubs in Morocco
Football clubs in Rabat
AS FAR (football)